Thomas Aiken (born 18 March 1946) is a Northern Irish retired footballer who played as an outside right. He played in the Football League for Doncaster Rovers.

References

Association footballers from Northern Ireland
NIFL Premiership players
Ballymena United F.C. players
Association football outside forwards
1946 births
Sportspeople from Ballymena
Living people
English Football League players
Doncaster Rovers F.C. players
Chelmsford City F.C. players
Northern Ireland amateur international footballers
Southern Football League players